Tatar, also known as Kosakan Tatar is a village in the Zangilan Rayon of Azerbaijan.

The village was captured by ethnic Armenian forces in 1992 during the First Nagorno-Karabakh War, and recaptured by Azerbaijani forces as part of the 2020 Nagorno-Karabakh conflict on October 22, 2020.

References

Populated places in Zangilan District